The abbreviation R800 can stand for:

 Radeon R800, the engineering codename for a Graphics Processing Unit by ATI/AMD
 R800 (CPU), the central processing unit used in the MSX Turbo-R home computer